The women's uneven bars was a gymnastics event contested as part of the Gymnastics at the 1964 Summer Olympics programme at the Tokyo Metropolitan Gymnasium.

Results

Preliminary

Each gymnast competed in both compulsory and optional exercises.  The score for each was determined by a panel of five judges, with the top and bottom scores being dropped before the remaining three were averaged (and truncated to three decimal places).  The two average scores were then summed.  This score was also used in calculating both individual all-around and team scores.

The top 6 advanced to the final for the apparatus, keeping half of their preliminary score to be added to their final score.

Final

References

Sources
 

Gymnastics at the 1964 Summer Olympics
1964 in women's gymnastics
Women's events at the 1964 Summer Olympics